Gross Misconduct is the second album from crossover thrash metal band, M.O.D. It was released in 1989 on Megaforce Records and Noise International and follows 1988's extended play Surfin' M.O.D. It was three years until the band released another record, with Rhythm of Fear in 1992.

Overview
Lyrically, Milano tackled less controversial issues than previously (including his time with S.O.D.) and the music was more accessible – the upshot of which was a more commercial offering.

The music video for "True Colors" starts off with a Slash look-alike plugging his guitar into the amp before being pushed out of the way by Billy Milano.

Track listing
All songs written by M.O.D. unless otherwise stated

Credits
 Billy Milano – vocals
 Louis Svitek – guitar
 John Monte – bass
 Tim Mallare – drums
 Recorded August – October, 1988 at Pyramid Sound, Ithaca, New York, USA
 Produced and engineered by Alex Perialas
 Assistant engineered by Rob Hunter
 Executive produced by Jon and Marsha Zazula
 Mastered by Tom Coyne at Hit Factory
 Cover illustration by Craig Hamilton

External links
Megaforce Records album page
Official S.O.D. and M.O.D. fansite
BNR Metal discography page

1989 albums
M.O.D. albums
Albums produced by Alex Perialas
Megaforce Records albums